Battling Buckaroo is a 1932 American western film directed by Armand Schaefer and starring Lane Chandler, Doris Hill and  Yakima Canutt.

Synopsis
A young outlaw Jack Winslow steps in to rescue a Mexican woman and her father who are being for their gold threatened by a gang.

Cast
 Lane Chandler as Jack Winslow
 Doris Hill as Tonia Mendoza
 Yakima Canutt as 	Sheriff Rawlins
 Lafe McKee as 	Senor Felipe Mendoza
 Bill Patton as 	Duke Lawson
 Ted Adams as 	Pedro
 Olin Francis as Deputy Bull Saunders
 Bartlett A. Carre as Henchman
 Pat Harmon as	Mexican Barfly 
 Cliff Lyons as Barfly 
 Raven the Horse as Raven - Jack's Horse

References

Bibliography
 Pitts, Michael R. Western Movies: A Guide to 5,105 Feature Films. McFarland, 2012.

External links
 

1932 films
1932 Western (genre) films
American black-and-white films
American Western (genre) films
Films directed by Armand Schaefer
1930s English-language films
1930s American films